Walsingham was a railway station on the Wells and Fakenham Railway, later part of the Great Eastern Railway. It opened on 1 December 1857, and served the villages of Great Walsingham and Little Walsingham. It closed on 5 October 1964. The station buildings were purchased in 1967 by a group of members of the Russian Orthodox Church and developed into a small monastic community house, including St. Seraphim's Russian Orthodox church.

The resident religious community has plans to further develop the site, including a permanent dual exhibition which will both showcase the religious life, in particular the art of icon painting, and also provide a historical review of the site's railway heritage.

Since 1982, there has been a second station at Walsingham - the southern terminus of the narrow gauge Wells and Walsingham Light Railway. This station is sited slightly to the north of the original, the latter now having a car and coach park on the site of the tracks.

References

Disused railway stations in Norfolk
Former Great Eastern Railway stations
Beeching closures in England
Railway stations in Great Britain opened in 1857
Railway stations in Great Britain closed in 1964
1857 establishments in England
Walsingham